Olivier Delaître (born 1 June 1967) is a former professional tennis player from France. He was semifinalist at the Wimbledon Championships in 1999 in doubles (partnering Fabrice Santoro), and reached the fourth round of the 1994 French Open and 1995 Australian Open in singles.

Career

Delaitre turned professional in 1986. 

In singles, he reached four ATP-tour finals, and achieved a career-high ranking of 33 in February 1995.

In doubles, he won 15 titles during his career and reached a career-high ranking of 3 in July 1999. In 1998, he won four doubles titles with Fabrice Santoro and together they qualified for the end-of-year ATP Finals, where they reached the semifinals. In 1999, Delaitre and Santoro lost in the semifinals of Wimbledon 7-5 in the final set to eventual champions Mahesh Bhupati and Leander Paes. Delaitre's biggest title was the Monte Carlo Masters in 1999, where - unseeded - he and Tim Henman won the tournament without dropping a set.

Delaitre was the first person to defeat future World No. 1 Roger Federer at a Grand Slam, in the first qualifying round of the 1999 Australian Open.

Career finals

Singles: 4 (0–4)

Doubles: 26 (15–11)

Doubles performance timeline

External links
 
 
 

1967 births
Living people
French male tennis players
Sportspeople from Hauts-de-Seine
Sportspeople from Metz